Diospyros wallichii is a tree in the family Ebenaceae. Twigs are rusty-hairy when young. Inflorescences bear up to nine flowers. The tree is named for the Danish botanist Nathaniel Wallich. Habitat is lowland mixed dipterocarp forests and limestone hills from sea-level to  altitude. D. wallichii is found from Burma to west Malesia.

References

wallichii
Plants described in 1905
Trees of Myanmar
Trees of Thailand
Trees of Sumatra
Trees of Peninsular Malaysia
Trees of Borneo